Thomas Paterson (born 30 March 1954 in Ashington) is an English former professional footballer who played in the Football League, as a forward.

References

External links

1954 births
Living people
Sportspeople from Ashington
Footballers from Northumberland
English footballers
Association football forwards
Leicester City F.C. players
Middlesbrough F.C. players
Hamilton Academical F.C. players
AFC Bournemouth players
Darlington F.C. players
Weymouth F.C. players
Poole Town F.C. players
Dorchester Town F.C. players
Salisbury City F.C. players
English Football League players